George Burton was an English professional footballer who played in the Football League for Middlesbrough and the Southern Football League for Cardiff City. His brother John was also a footballer and the pair played together at Cardiff City.

Career
Burton signed for Southern Football League Second Division Cardiff City in 1911, joining his brother John at the club. He made his debut in a goalless draw with Portsmouth on 21 October before scoring his first goal for the club in a 4–2 victory over Cwm Albion a week later.

Honours
Cardiff City
 Southern Football League Second Division winner: 1912–13
 Welsh Cup winner: 1912

References

Year of birth missing
Year of death missing
English footballers
Association football forwards
Middlesbrough F.C. players
Cardiff City F.C. players
English Football League players
Southern Football League players